USS Dextrous has been the name of two ships of the United States Navy.

 , an  built in 1943.

United States Navy ship names